The year 519 BC was a year of the pre-Julian Roman calendar. In the Roman Empire, it was known as year 235  Ab urbe condita. The denomination 519 BC for this year has been used since the early medieval period, when the Anno Domini calendar era became the prevalent method in Europe for naming years.

Events

By place

Greece 
  Herodotus tells that Cleomenes happened to be in the vicinity of Plataia, when the Plataians requested an alliance with Sparta, which he rejected, but instead he advised them to ally with Athens, because he wanted to stir a border conflict between Thebes and Athens, two of the most powerful poleis of central Greece.

China 
Zhou Jing Wang/Ji Gail becomes King of the Zhou Dynasty of China.

Births 
 Cincinnatus, Roman aristocrat and statesman (d. 430 BC)
 Xerxes I of Persia, fourth king of Persia (or 518 BC) (d. 465 BC)

Deaths

References